Hanthane Kathawa (Sinhalese language word means "Story of Hanthana") is a 1969 film based on a love story of university students of Sri Lanka. It was directed by famous Sri Lankan film director Sugathapala Senarath Yapa and screened on August 1, 1968. This film also remarks the cinema debut of famous actor Vijaya Kumaratunga.

Synopsis
Love story of Hanthane.
The love story based on some studens of University of Peradeniya ( Hanthana area ).The university formerly known as University of ceylon .

Cast
 Vijaya Kumaratunga
 Amarasiri Kalansuriya
 Tony Ranasinghe as Anura
 Swarna Mallawarachchi
 J. B. L. Gunasekera as Father
 Sobani Amarasinghe
 Sunila Jayanthi
 Denawaka Hamine
 Daya Thennakoon
 Samanthi Lanerolle
 Edmund Jayasinghe
 Dharmadasa Kuruppu
 Berty Jayasekera

Music

External links
Official Website - National Film Corporation of Sri Lanka
 
Sri Lanka Cinema Database

1968 films
Films set in Sri Lanka (1948–present)